George D. Fowler (1860 – October 14, 1909) was a Pennsylvania Railroad official. He was considered an authority on golf. He was President of the American Society of Signal Engineers.

Biography
He was born in 1860 in Alexandria, Virginia.  He was closely related to George Washington and was a brother-in-law of Fitzhugh Lee.

He became president of the American Society of Signal Engineers.

He died of heart disease on October 14, 1909, at the Rittenhouse Club in Philadelphia, Pennsylvania.

References

1860 births
1909 deaths
20th-century American railroad executives
Businesspeople from Alexandria, Virginia
Businesspeople from Philadelphia
19th-century American businesspeople